"Booyah (Here We Go)" is a song by German-based music project Sweetbox, with Kimberley Kearney, also known as Tempest as the frontwoman. A Euro house track, it was released as their debut single in 1995 and created initial success for Sweetbox in Germany, where it peaked at number eight, and in France, where it reached number 15. Two of its remixes can also be found on the compilation album Best Of 12" Collection. The accompanying music video for the song was directed by Horst Czenskowski.

Track listing

Charts

References

1995 debut singles
1995 songs
English-language German songs
Sweetbox songs